Fletcher Jones may refer to:

Fletcher Jones (Australian entrepreneur) (1895–1977), Australian clothing manufacturer and retailer
Fletcher Jones (American entrepreneur) (1931–1972), American businessman and computer pioneer

See also
Fletcher-Jones, English songwriting team